Dirofilariasis is an infection by parasites of the genus Dirofilaria. It is transmitted through a mosquito bite; its main hosts include dogs and wild canids. These can give rise to granulomas in the pulmonary artery. Some common symptoms include cough, fever and pleural effusion. It may also appear on X-rays of the chest.

Causes
It can be caused by:
 Dirofilaria immitis
 Dirofilaria repens
 Dirofilaria tenuis

Diagnosis
Dirofilariasis is often diagnosed by the examination of tissue obtained as part of the diagnostic investigation of coin lesions. Blood tests are not yet helpful in the diagnosis of dirofilariasis in humans.

Treatment
Treatment with tetracycline antibiotics has been reported to damage Dirofilaria immitis, often causing death of adult worms.

References

External links 

Helminthiases
Zoonoses